Arvo “Poika” Tuominen (5 September 1894 – 27 May 1981) was a Finnish communist revolutionary and later a social democratic journalist, politician and author. Tuominen was given his nickname, "Poika", in 1920 because of his boyish look; poika means "boy" in Finnish.

Tuominen was born in 1894 in Kuotila (part of Hämeenkyrö) to the family of a rural carpenter. In 1912 he moved to Tampere to become a carpenter's apprentice and soon joined the Social Democratic Party of Finland. During the Finnish Civil War in early 1918, Tuominen sided with the Finnish Red Guards and edited Kansan lehti, a radical social democratic newspaper in Tampere. He was shortly arrested when the White Guards took the city in April, but he was soon released. After the Red Guards were defeated in May 1918 several Finnish radical social democratic leaders fled to Russia, where they split from the mainstream of Finnish Social Democratic Party and founded the Communist Party of Finland in Petrograd in August–September 1918.

Tuominen became a supporter of Otto Wille Kuusinen's faction within the party. In 1921 he traveled to Petrograd, where Kuusinen's adherents, supported by the Comintern leadership, successfully challenged Kullervo Manner's supporters at the next party congress. Tuominen was elected to the party's Central Committee and was put in charge of its Finnish bureau. He returned to Finland, where he was arrested on 26 January 1922, and subsequently imprisoned for publishing a proclamation urging Finnish workers to fight on the Soviet side during the Soviet-Finnish conflict over Karelia. He was released from the Tammisaari prison camp in the spring of 1926 and was elected secretary of the Finnish Federation of Trade Unions. He was again arrested in April 1928 for maintaining contacts with the Soviet Union and the banned Communist Party.

In late 1932 Tuominen was paroled and received a letter from Kuusinen, who was then one of the Comintern's secretaries, urging him to move to the Soviet Union. Tuominen secretly went to Sweden and then, in April 1933, to the Soviet Union, where he moved into Kuusinen's apartment. He was given a crash course at the International Lenin School and was appointed General Secretary of the Finnish Communist Party, also becoming a member of the Comintern Executive Committee Presidium.

Tuominen witnessed the Great Purge firsthand until he was able to leave Moscow for Stockholm in early 1938. On 23 November 1939 he was ordered to return to Moscow. Tuominen later claimed that he was being recalled to become the head of the communist government of the Finnish Democratic Republic, which Stalin planned to install in Finland. However, according to Tuominen, he refused to obey the order, broke with the Soviet Union and ordered the Communist Party of Finland not to assist the Red Army during the Winter War and to fight for Finland instead.

Research by the Finnish historian Kimmo Rentola has exposed a somewhat different story. When the Winter War started, Tuominen was initially enthusiastic of the war in expectation of a quick Soviet victory. However, as the Soviet advance halted and international opinion rallied to Finland's support, Tuominen's doubts started. He began to avoid contacting Moscow and sent feelers to Finnish Social Democrats. It was only after the end of the Winter War that Tuominen took the step of severing his ties with the Soviet Union and started writing anticommunist pamphlets, which were given widespread publicity in Finland. Tuominen had gone underground in Sweden, and it took some time for Moscow to find out what had happened. Within the Finnish communist movement, Tuominen became later known as the ultimate traitor.

Tuominen remained in Sweden until 1956, when he returned to Finland and published three volumes of bestselling memoirs in 1956–1958. Especially the second volume, Kremlin kellot ("The Bells of Kremlin") had a great impact in Finland, being a critical description and an inside view of the Soviet Union under Stalin, written by a former leading Finnish communist who had met both Lenin and Stalin. Tuominen joined the Social Democratic Party, edited its newspaper Kansan Lehti in Tampere for five years and became a member of parliament for one term (1958–1962). 

Tuominen died in Tampere in 1981. He was the last surviving former member of the Comintern Presidium.

References
 Tuominen, Arvo (1983): The Bells of the Kremlin. Hanover and London, University Press of New England, 
 Rentola, Kimmo (1994): Kenen joukoissa seisot? Suomalainen kommunismi ja sota 1937–1945.

Notes

External links
 Arvo Tuominen Finnish parliament

20th-century Finnish journalists
1894 births
1981 deaths
People from Hämeenkyrö
People from Turku and Pori Province (Grand Duchy of Finland)
Social Democratic Party of Finland politicians
Communist Party of Finland politicians
Members of the Parliament of Finland (1958–62)
People of the Finnish Civil War (Red side)
Finnish people of World War II
Former Marxists
Finnish anti-communists